South Dakota Highway 106 (SD 106) is a  state highway in the northeastern part of the U.S. state of South Dakota. It links Claire City with Hammer. It was commissioned in 1976, following the former route of SD 15.

Route description
SD 106 begins as 455th Avenue at a junction with SD 25 and continues south into Claire City. It continues south out of the town as Main Street after crossing the railroad tracks before turning east as 106th Street. SD 106 continues east to its terminus at SD 127.

Major intersections

References 

106
Transportation in Roberts County, South Dakota